The 2016 Bill Beaumont Cup, also known as Bill Beaumont Cup Division One, was the 116th version of the annual, English rugby union, County Championship organized by the RFU for the top tier English counties.  Each county drew its players from rugby union clubs from the third tier and below of the English rugby union league system (typically National League 1, National League 2 North or National League 2 South). The counties were divided into two regional pools with the winners of each meeting in the final held at Twickenham Stadium.  New counties to the competition were the two finalists from the 2015 County Championship Plate – Surrey (winners) and Eastern Counties (runners-up) who replaced Kent and Durham who were relegated from their respective groups.   Cornwall were the defending champions.
  
The two pool winners, Cheshire (north) and holders Cornwall met in the final.  Cheshire had beaten 2015's runners up, Lancashire, in the pool stage, but came up short against a Cornish side managed once more by Graham Dawe who had lost his job at Plymouth Albion at the end of the season. The bulk of his team were Albion players, and they beat Cheshire, 35-13, to retain their title, with Matthew Shepherd having another good final by getting 20 of Cornwall's points including a last minute try.  Due to changes to the County Championship format for the 2017 competition, no teams would be relegated to the second tier of the county championships for the following season.

Competition format
The competition format is two regional group stages divided into north and south, with each team playing each other once.  This means that two teams in the pool have two home games, while the other two had just one.  The top side in each group goes through to the final held at Twickenham Stadium.  Unlike previous seasons, due to changes to the following seasons championships there would be no relegation.

Participating Counties and ground locations

Group stage

Division 1 North

Round 1

Round 2

Round 3

Division 1 South

Round 1

Round 2

Round 3

Final

Total season attendances
Does not include final at Twickenham which is a neutral venue and involves teams from all three county divisions on the same day

Individual statistics
 Note if players are tied on tries or points the player with the lowest number of appearances will come first.  Also note that points scorers includes tries as well as conversions, penalties and drop goals.  Appearance figures also include coming on as substitutes (unused substitutes not included).  Statistics will also include final.

Top points scorers

Top try scorers

See also
 English rugby union system
 Rugby union in England

References

External links
 NCA Rugby

2016